The Draytons Two were a popular Barbadian spouge band of the 1970s known for their own and unique style of syncretic spouge, the raw spouge.  Raw Spouge is also the title of their first studio album published through Jamaican record label WIRL in 1973.

Discography

Studio albums
 Raw Spouge (WIRL; 1973)

Singles
 "G.O. Go" (WIRL; 1973)
 "Brother to Brother" / "River Come Down" (WIRL, 1978)

Appearances
 Various artists – Original Reggae Sound (Warner Bros. Records; 1976)
 Various artists – Reggae Fever (WEA; 1979)
 Various artists – Super Reggae I (WEA, 1979)
 Various artists – Vintage Spouge: Nostalgic Hits Vol. 1 (Caribbean Records; 2002)

References

Sources

External links

The Draytons Two discography at Rate Your Music

Barbadian musical groups
Calypso musical groups
Barbadian reggae musical groups
Barbadian ska groups
1970s establishments in Barbados